Bian Jianxin is a Chinese Paralympic powerlifter. She represented China at the Summer Paralympics in 2000, 2004 and 2008 and in total she won three gold medals. She won the gold medal in the women's 40 kg event in 2000, in the women's 48 kg event in 2004 and in the women's 60 kg event in 2008.

References

External links 
 

Living people
Year of birth missing (living people)
Place of birth missing (living people)
Powerlifters at the 2000 Summer Paralympics
Powerlifters at the 2004 Summer Paralympics
Powerlifters at the 2008 Summer Paralympics
Medalists at the 2000 Summer Paralympics
Medalists at the 2004 Summer Paralympics
Medalists at the 2008 Summer Paralympics
Paralympic gold medalists for China
Paralympic medalists in powerlifting
Paralympic powerlifters of China
Chinese powerlifters
21st-century Chinese women